The 1925 Tour de Hongrie was the inaugural edition of the Tour de Hongrie cycle race and was held from 27 to 29 June 1925. The race started and finished in Budapest. The race was won by Károly Jerzsabek. The patron of the race was Miklós Horthy.

Route

General classification

References

1925
Tour de Hongrie
Tour de Hongrie
June 1925 sports events